Godehard Link (born 7 July 1944 in Lippstadt) is a professor of logic and philosophy of science at the University of Munich.

External links
Godehard Link at Munich Center for Mathematical Philosophy

Link
Academic staff of the Ludwig Maximilian University of Munich
Philosophy academics
Living people
1944 births
German male writers
People from Lippstadt
Ludwig Maximilian University of Munich alumni